Sultan Al hajj Hassan Nooraddeenul Iskandhar I was the Sultan of the Maldives from 1779–1799. He was the son of Sultan Muhammad Mu'iz ud-din. Nooraddeen went on hajj twice and on the second occasion he battled with the Sharif of Mecca. He died in Jeddah, together with 238  of the men of the  Maldivian army, from an infectious disease called kashividhuri or smallpox.

18th-century sultans of the Maldives
1799 deaths
Deaths from smallpox
Year of birth unknown